David Bolton may refer to:

David Bolton (Australian footballer) (born 1960), Australian rules footballer 
Dave Bolton (1937–2021), English rugby league footballer

See also
David Boulton, American activist